No One Thinks Of Greenland is a 2003 novel by John Griesemer, upon which the film Guy X was based.

Plot summary
The book is set after the Korean War.  The novel follows the misadventures of the character Rudy Spruance who has been mistaken for another soldier and inadvertently assigned to Greenland.

2003 novels
Novels set in Greenland
Novels set in the 1950s